The 2021–22 season was Bristol City Football Club's 124th season in existence and seventh consecutive season in the Championship. They also competed in the FA Cup and the EFL Cup.

Squad

Statistics

Players with names in italics and marked * were on loan from another club for the whole of their season with Bristol City.

|-
!colspan=15|Players out on loan:

|-
!colspan=15|Players who left the club:

|}

Goals record

Disciplinary

Transfers

Transfers in

Loans in

Loans out

Transfers out

Pre-season friendlies
Bristol City announced they would face Celtic, Portsmouth, Milton Keynes Dons, Exeter City and Plymouth Argyle as part of their pre-season preparations.

Competitions

Overview

EFL Championship

League table

Results summary

Results by matchday

Matches
Bristol City's fixtures were revealed on 24 June 2021.

FA Cup

City were drawn at home to Fulham in the third round.

EFL Cup

Bristol City were drawn away to Forest Green Rovers in the first round.

References

External links

Bristol City F.C. seasons
Bristol City F.C.